The Tarner lectures are a series of public lectures in the philosophy of science given at Trinity College, Cambridge since 1916. Named after Mr Edward Tarner, the lecture addresses 'the Philosophy of the Sciences and the Relations or Want of Relations between the different Departments of Knowledge.' The inaugural lecture was given by Alfred North Whitehead in the autumn of 1919 and are published as his "The concept of nature."

Past Lectures 
Full list of Past Tarner Lectures

References

Bibliography/Further Reading

External links 
Web page at Trinity College

Lecture series at the University of Cambridge
Philosophy of science events
Recurring events established in 1916
Science lecture series
Trinity College, Cambridge